Devils Island, Nova Scotia is located on the northeast entrance of Halifax Harbour part of the Halifax Regional Municipality off the coast of the community of Eastern Passage, Nova Scotia.  The name originated from an early French merchant and was first spelled Deville's Island. The first permanent settlement on this  island was established in 1830, and by 1850 there were three houses and a school. By 1901 the settlement had grown to 18 houses.  A number of Devil's Island residents, notably Ben Henneberry, provided valuable folklore to pioneering Canadian folklorist Helen Creighton. Most of the residents were moved to the mainland during World War II. The last permanent resident, a Norwegian artist, moved off in 2000. The island is currently owned by Halifax entrepreneur Bill Mont. The Devil's Island Lighthouse built in 1877, replacing an earlier tower built in 1852, is still standing but is not functional and is threatened.  The island was also the base for a rescue lifeboat until the 1950s which saved the crews of many vessels stranded on the shoals approaching Halifax Harbour.

References

Friends of Mcnabs Island Society
Nova Scotia Lighthouse Preservation Society (NSLPS)

Islands of Nova Scotia
Maritime history of Canada
Landforms of Halifax, Nova Scotia
General Service Areas in Nova Scotia
Landforms of Halifax County, Nova Scotia